In Jewish tradition, the Messiah's Donkey (Hebrew: חמורו של משיח) refers to the donkey upon which the Messiah will arrive to redeem the world at the end of days. In Modern Hebrew the phrase "the Messiah's donkey" is used to refer to someone who does the 'dirty work' on behalf of someone else.

The origin of the belief can be found in : "... your king is coming to you; righteous and having salvation is he, humble and mounted on a donkey, on a colt, the foal of a donkey." The 'king' referred to in this verse is interpreted by Chazal as referring to the Messiah.

In the discussion regarding this verse in the Babylonian Talmud (Sanhedrin 98a), a story is told of the Persian king Shevor, who says to Samuel, one of the Amoraim, "You say that the Messiah will come on a donkey; I will send him the riding horse that I have." In response to the ridicule of the king, Samuel answers, "Do you have a horse with one thousand colors like the donkey of the Messiah? Certainly his donkey will be miraculous."

In the New Testament it is told that as Jesus approached the Mount of Olives, he sent two of his disciples to a nearby village to fetch him a donkey, or exactly an Onager or wild donkey. Upon their return, Jesus rode the donkey into Jerusalem, where he was met by cheering crowds. According to the Christian religious tradition, this was the fulfillment of the prophecy of Zechariah 9:9.

According to some Muslim historians and scholars the prophecy of the Messiah's Donkey was fulfilled when Umar ibn al-Khattab travelling alone with one donkey and one servant. When he arrived in Jerusalem, he was greeted by Sophronius, who undoubtedly must have been amazed that the caliph of the Muslims, one of the most powerful people in world arriving on a donkey which fulfilled the prophecy in Zechariah 9:9: "... your king is coming to the arrival."

Modern references
In Israel, the phrase "the Messiah's Donkey" can also refer to the controversial political-religious doctrine ascribed to the teachings of  Avraham Yitzhak Kook which claims that secular Jews, which represent the material world, are an instrument in the hands of God whose purpose it was to establish the State of Israel and begin the process of redemption, but upon its establishment they would be required to step aside and allow the Religious-Haredi public to govern the state. According to this analogy, the secular Jewish public are the "donkey", while the Religious-Haredi public who would take their place represent a collective quasi-Messianic body. A book called The Messiah's Donkey, which focuses on this issue, was published in 1998 by Seffi Rachlevsky and caused widespread controversy among the Jewish-Israeli public; according to Hassidic teaching the donkey is a symbol of the fact that the Messiah and Messianic age will not oppose the material world, but rather harness it for sacred purposes. Thus, the act of riding upon the donkey is a symbol of the sovereignty of the Messiah over the material world (represented by the donkey).

References

Animals in the Bible
Book of Zechariah
Politics of Israel
Jewish eschatology
Legendary mammals
Donkeys